Tharike is a village in the Ludhiana district of Punjab, India.

Geography

Tharike is located on the outskirts of Ludhiana city. Jhande (1.5 km), Lalton Khurd and Lalton are the nearby villages.

Culture

Punjabi is the mother tongue as well as official language of the village. The people mostly are Sikhs with other minorities.

Demographics

As of 2001 census, the village has the total population of 8884 with 4773 males and 4111 females thus males constitutes 54% and females 46% of population with the sex ratio of 861 females per thousand males.

Personalites

A well known Punjabi writer and songwriter/lyricist, Dev Tharike Wala, belongs to this village.

References

  
Villages in Ludhiana district